Satish Gujral (25 December 1925 – 26 March 2020) was an Indian painter, sculptor, muralist and writer of the post-independent era. He was awarded the Padma Vibhushan, the second-highest civilian award of the Republic of India, in 1999. His elder brother, Inder Kumar Gujral, was the Prime Minister of India between 1997 and 1998.

Early life
Gujral was born in Jhelum in the Punjab Province of British India (now in Punjab, Pakistan) into a Punjabi Hindu Khatri family. When he was crossing a rickety bridge in Kashmir, he slipped and fell into the rapids, which later resulted in impairment of hearing, which he regained after surgery in 1998, 62 years later.

Education
Because of his hearing problem, many schools refused admission to Gujral. One day he saw a bird sitting on a tree branch and drew a picture of it. It was an early indication of his interest in painting and later in 1939, he joined the Mayo School of Arts in Lahore, to study applied arts. He moved to Bombay in 1944 and enrolled in the Sir JJ School of Art. In 1947, due to a recurring sickness, he was forced to drop out of school and leave Bombay.

In 1952, Gujral received a scholarship to study at the Palacio de Bellas Artes in Mexico City, where he was apprenticed to the renowned artists Diego Rivera and David Alfaro Siqueiros.

Works
The Partition of India and the associated agony of the immigrants impacted a young Satish and manifested itself in the artworks he created. From 1952 to 1974, Gujral organised shows of his sculptures, paintings and graphics in many cities across the world such as New York City, New Delhi, Montreal, Berlin and Tokyo, among others.

Gujral was also an architect and his design of the Belgium Embassy in New Delhi was selected by the international forum of architects as one of the finest buildings built in the 20th century.

Personal life
Gujral lived with his wife Kiran in New Delhi. Their son Mohit Gujral, who is an architect, is married to former model, Feroze Gujral. They also have 2 daughters, Alpana, a jewellery designer, and Raseel Gujral Ansal, an interior designer and owner of Casa Paradox & Casa Pop and is married to Navin Ansal.

Satish was the brother of  I. K. Gujral , the 12th Prime Minister of India.

In popular culture
Dozens of documentaries have been made recording Gujral's work. The Films Division of India produced a short documentary film on his life, titled Satish Gujral, directed by Balwant Gargi it provides an overview of his life and works.

He was also part of the 2007 BBC television film, Partition: The Day India Burned. A 24-minute documentary called "A Brush with Life" was released on 15 February 2012 which was based on his own book with the same name. Four books of his work have been published, including an autobiography.

Awards
Gujral was awarded India's second-highest civilian honour Padma Vibhushan in 1999. In April 2014, he was honoured with NDTV Indian of the Year Award.

References

External links 
"Satish Gujral Profile, Interview and Artworks"
"Satish Gujral on the Architect in him"

1925 births
2020 deaths
People from Jhelum
Indian male painters
Indian male sculptors
Punjabi people
Punjabi Hindus
Indian graphic designers
Recipients of the Padma Vibhushan in arts
National College of Arts alumni
20th-century Indian sculptors
20th-century Indian painters
20th-century Indian architects
20th-century Indian designers
Male artists from Punjab, India
Government College of Art, Chandigarh alumni
20th-century Indian male artists